Mikalay Mikalayevich Branfilaw (born 16 December 1977) is a Belarusian football coach and former player.

Career

Club career
In his career he has played for clubs in Belarus and Poland, including Wisła Płock, Radomiak Radom, FC Gomel and BATE Borisov.

International career
Branfilaw twice performed in Belarusian national team. He played in a friendlies against Romania and Latvia in 2004.

Coaching career
In 2014 Mikalay Branfilaw was named as new coach of Torpedo Minsk.

References

External links
 
 
 
 

Living people
1977 births
Belarusian footballers
Footballers from Minsk
Association football defenders
Belarus international footballers
Belarusian expatriate footballers
Expatriate footballers in Poland
Belarusian expatriate sportspeople in Poland
Wisła Płock players
Radomiak Radom players
FC BATE Borisov players
FC Gomel players
FC Belshina Bobruisk players
Podbeskidzie Bielsko-Biała players
FC Torpedo-BelAZ Zhodino players
FC Shakhtyor Soligorsk players
FC Naftan Novopolotsk players
FC Torpedo Minsk players
Belarusian football managers
FC Torpedo Minsk managers
FC Osipovichi managers
FC Granit Mikashevichi managers
FC Orsha managers